Yadira Esperanza Bendaña Flores (born 20 November 1968, in Tegucigalpa) is a Honduran journalist and politician. She currently serves as deputy of the National Congress of Honduras representing the Liberal Party of Honduras for Francisco Morazán.

She is well known in her country for being the host of the annual Teletón for six years; she left Televicentro due to labour disputes. In 2009, in the aftermath of the 2009 coup d'etat she was assaulted by an unknown man who called her a "golpista".

References

1968 births
Living people
People from Tegucigalpa
Honduran journalists
Honduran women journalists
Liberal Party of Honduras politicians
Deputies of the National Congress of Honduras
People from Francisco Morazán Department
21st-century Honduran women politicians
21st-century Honduran politicians
21st-century Honduran women writers
21st-century Honduran writers
20th-century Honduran women writers
20th-century Honduran writers